Chlorisanis basirufofemoralis is a species of beetle in the family Cerambycidae. It was described by Stephan von Breuning in 1957. It is known from Sumatra.

References

Saperdini
Beetles described in 1957